Marvel Super Heroes (MSHRPG) is a role playing game set in the Marvel Universe, first published by TSR as the boxed set Marvel Super Heroes: The Heroic Role-Playing Game under license from Marvel Comics in 1984. In 1986, TSR published the Marvel Superheroes Advanced Game, an expanded edition. Jeff Grubb designed both editions, and Steve Winter wrote both editions. Both use the same game system.

The game lets players assume the roles of Marvel superheroes such as Spider-Man, Daredevil, Hulk, Captain America, the Fantastic Four, and the X-Men. 
Grubb designed the game to be easily understood, and the simplest version, found in the 16-page "Battle Book" of the Basic Set, contains a bare-bones combat system sufficient to resolve comic book style superhero fights.

System

Attributes 
Players resolve most game situations by rolling percentile dice and comparing the results against a column of the colorful "Universal Results Table". The attribute used determines which column to use; different tasks map to different attributes. 

All characters have seven basic attributes:

Fighting determines hit probability in and defense against hand-to-hand attacks.

Agility determines hit probability in and defense against ranged attacks, feats of agility vs. the environment, and acrobatics.

Strength determines damage inflicted by hand-to-hand attacks, grappling, or lifting and breaking heavy objects.

Endurance determines resistance to physical damage (e.g., poison, disease, death). It also determines how long a character can fight and how fast a character can move at top speed.

Reason determines the success of tasks relating to knowledge, puzzle-solving, and advanced technology.

Intuition determines the success of tasks relating to awareness, perception, and instinct.

Psyche determines the success of tasks relating to willpower, psionics, and magic.

Players sometimes refer to this set of attributes and the game system as a whole by the acronym "FASERIP". Attribute scores for most characters range from 1 to 100, where normal human ability is Typical (6), and peak (non-superheroic) human ability is Excellent (20). The designers minimize use of the numerical figures, instead preferring adjectives like "Incredible" (36-45) and "Amazing" (46-62). A "Typical" (5-7) attribute has a 50% base chance for success at most tasks relating to that attribute. As an attribute increases, the chance of success increases about 5% per 10 points. Thus a character with an "Amazing" (50) attribute has a 75% chance of success at tasks relating to that attribute.

Superpowers and origins
Beyond the seven attributes, characters have superpowers that function on a mostly ad hoc basis, and each character's description gives considerable space to a description of how their powers work in the game.

Each character has an origin which puts ceilings on a character's abilities and superpowers. The origins include:

Altered Humans are normal people who acquire powers, such as Spider-Man or the Fantastic Four.

High-Tech Wonders are normal people whose powers come from devices, such as Iron Man.

Mutants are persons born with superpowers, such as the X-Men.

Robots are created beings, such as the Vision and Ultron.

Aliens are non-humans, including extra-dimensional beings such as Thor and Hercules.

Talents
The game also features a simple skill system referred to as Talents. Talents must be learned and cover areas of knowledge from Archery to Zoology. A Talent raises a character's ability by one rank when attempting actions related to that Talent. The GM is free to determine if a character would be unable to attempt an action without the appropriate Talent (such as a character with no medical background attempting to make a pill that can cure a rare disease).

Resources and Popularity
Characters also has two variable attributes: Resources and Popularity. These attributes use the same terms as the character's seven attributes ("Poor," "Amazing," "Unearthly," etc.). But unlike the seven physical and mental attributes, which change slowly, if at all, Resources and Popularity can change quickly.

Resources represent the character's wealth. Rather than have the player keep track of how much money the character has, the Advanced Game assumes the character has enough money to cover basic living expenses. The Resources ability is used when the character tries to buy something like a new car or house. The game books note that a character's Resources score can change after winning the lottery or having a major business transaction go bad, among other things.

Popularity reflects how much the character is liked or disliked. Popularity can influence non-player characters. A superhero with a high rating, like Captain America (whose popularity is Unearthly-the highest most characters can achieve), might use his Popularity to gain entrance to a club. If he were to try the same thing as his secret identity Steve Rogers (whose Popularity is only Typical), he would probably be unable to do it. Villains also have a Popularity score, which is usually negative (a bouncer might let Doctor Doom or Magneto into the aforementioned club out of fear). Popularity can change, too.

Character creation
The game is intended to use existing Marvel characters as the heroes. The Basic Set and Advanced Set both contain simple systems for creating original superheroes, based on random ability rolls (as in Dungeons & Dragons). In addition, the Basic Set Campaign Book allows players to create original heroes by describing the desired kind of hero and working together with the GM to assign the appropriate abilities, powers, and talents.

The Ultimate Powers Book, by David Edward Martin, expands and organizes the game's list of powers. Players are given a variety of body types, secret origins, weaknesses, and powers to choose from. The UPB gives a greater range to characters one could create. The book suffers from editing problems and omissions; several errata and partial revisions were released in the pages of TSR's Dragon magazine in issue #122 "The Ultimate Addenda to the Ultimate Powers Book", issue #134 "The Ultimate Addenda's Addenda", issue #150 "Death Effects on Superheroes", and issue #151 "Son of the Ultimate Addenda".

Karma
The game's equivalent of experience points is Karma, a pool of points initially determined by the sum of a character's three mental attributes (Reason, Intuition, and Psyche).

The basic system allows players to increase their chances of success at most tasks by spending points of Karma. For example, a player who wants to make sure he hits a villain in a critical situation can spend however many Karma points are necessary to raise the dice roll to the desired result. The referee distributes additional Karma points at the end of game sessions, typically as rewards for accomplishing heroic goals such as defeating villains, saving innocents, and foiling crimes. Karma can also be lost for unheroic actions such as fleeing from a villain or failing to stop a crime. In fact, in a notable departure from many RPGs, but strongly in keeping with the genre, all Karma is lost if a hero kills someone or allows someone to die.

In the Advanced Game, Karma points can also be spent to permanently increase character attributes and powers.

Game mechanics 
Two primary game mechanics drive the game: column shifts and colored results. Both influence the difficulty of an action.

A column shift is used when a character is trying a hard or easy action. A column shift to the left indicates a penalty, while a shift to the right indicates a bonus.

The column for each ability is divided into four colors: white, green, yellow, and red. A white result is always a failure or unfavorable outcome. In most cases, getting a green result is all that is needed to succeed at a particular action. Yellow and red results usually indicate more favorable results that could knock back, stun, or even kill an opponent. However, the GM can determine that succeeding at a hard task might require a yellow or red result.

Additional rules in the "Campaign Book" of the Basic Set, and the subsequent Advanced Set, use the same game mechanic to resolve non-violent tasks.

Official game supplements 

The original Marvel Super Heroes game received extensive support from TSR, covering a variety of Marvel Comics characters and settings, including a Gamer's Handbook of the Marvel Universe patterned after Marvel's Official Handbook of the Marvel Universe. MSH also got its own column in the TSR-published gaming magazine, Dragon, called "The Marvel-phile", which usually spotlighted a character or group of characters that hadn't yet appeared in a published game product.

Reception
In the July–August 1984 edition of Space Gamer (No. 70), Allen Varney wrote that the game was only suited to younger players and Marvel fanatics, saying, "this is a respectable effort, and an excellent introductory game for a devoted Marvel fan aged 10 to 12; older, more experienced, or less devoted buyers will probably be disappointed. 'Nuff said."

Pete Tamlyn reviewed Marvel Super Heroes for Imagine magazine and stated that "this game has been produced in collaboration with Marvel and that opportunity itself is probably worth a new game release. However, Marvel Superheroes is not just another Superhero game. In many ways it is substantially different from other SHrpgs."

In the January–February 1985 edition of Different Worlds (Issue #38), Troy Christensen gave it an average rating of 2.5 stars out of 4, saying, "The Marvel Super Heroes roleplaying game overall is a basic and simple system which I would recommend for beginning and novice players [...] People who enjoy a fast and uncomplicated game and like a system which is conservative and to the point will like this game."

Marcus L. Rowland reviewed Marvel Super Heroes for White Dwarf #62, giving it an overall rating of 8 out of 10, and stated that "All in all, a useful system which is suitable for beginning players and referees, but should still suit experienced gamers."

Seven years later, Varney revisited the game in the August 1991 edition of Dragon (Issue #172), reviewing the new Basic Set edition that had just been released. While Varney appreciated that the game was designed for younger players, he felt that it failed to recreate the excitement of the comics. "This is the gravest flaw of this system and support line: its apathy about recreating the spirit of Marvel stories. In this new Basic Set edition... you couldn’t find a miracle if you used microscopic vision. Look at this set’s few elementary mini-scenarios: all fight scenes. The four-color grandeur and narrative magic in the best Marvel stories are absent. Is this a good introduction to role-playing?" Varney instead suggested Toon by Steve Jackson Games or Ghostbusters by West End Games as better role-playing alternatives for new and beginning young players.
  
In the 2007 book Hobby Games: The 100 Best, Steve Kenson commented that "it's a testament to the game's longevity that it still has enthusiastic fan support on the Internet and an active play community more than a decade after its last product was published. Even more so that it continues to set a standard by which new superhero roleplaying games are measured. Like modern comic book writers and artists following the greats of the Silver Age, modern RPG designers have a tough act to follow."

Later Marvel RPGs 

Before losing the Marvel license back to Marvel Comics, TSR published a different game using their SAGA System game engine, called the Marvel Super Heroes Adventure Game. This version, written by Mike Selinker, was published in the late 1990s as a card-based version of the Marvel role-playing game (though a method of converting characters from the prior format to the SAGA System was included in the core rules). Though critically praised in various reviews at the time, it never reached a large market and has since faded into obscurity.

In 2003, after the gaming license had reverted to Marvel Comics, the Marvel Universe Roleplaying Game was published by Marvel Comics. This edition uses mechanics  totally different from any previous versions, using a diceless game mechanic that incorporated a Karma-based resolution system of "stones" (or tokens) to represent character effort. Since its initial publication, a few additional supplements were published by Marvel Comics. However, Marvel stopped supporting the game a little over a year after its initial release, despite going through several printings of the core rulebook.

In August 2011, Margaret Weis Productions acquired the licence to publish an RPG based on Marvel superheroes, and  Marvel Heroic Roleplaying was released beginning in 2012. Margaret Weis Productions, however, found that although the game was critically acclaimed, winning two Origins Awards, Marvel Heroic Roleplaying: Civil War "didn’t garner the level of sales necessary to sustain the rest of the line" so they brought the game to a close at the end of April 2013.

References

External links
 

Marvel Comics role-playing games
Marvel Super Heroes (role-playing game)
Role-playing games introduced in 1984
TSR, Inc. games